The Basilica Shrine of Our Lady Mediatrix of All Graces or the Basilica of Santa Maria is a Catholic church dedicated to the Virgin Mary, located in Santa Maria municipality, Rio Grande do Sul, in the south of Brazil.  It is the only basilica in the world dedicated to Mary the Mediatrix of all Graces.

The basilica gives its name to the avenue and the neighborhood where it is located, on the other hand it is the end point of the Pilgrimage of the "medianera".

The devotion to the Mediatrix Virgin began in 1928, with the arrival of the Jesuits. In 1935, Don Antonio Reis blessed the first stone, beginning the work of building the sanctuary. In 1942, the bishops of Rio Grande do Sul consecrated the state to the Mediator Virgin declaring her the Chief Patroness of the state. In 1943, on the initiative of Don Antonio Reis, the first romeria (a group religious pilgrimage) was held in the state. The church was declared a Basilica in 1987 during the pontificate of Pope John Paul II.

See also
Roman Catholicism in Brazil
Our Lady Mediatrix of All Graces

References

Basilica churches in Brazil
Roman Catholic churches completed in 1942
Roman Catholic shrines in Brazil
Roman Catholic churches in Rio Grande do Sul
1928 establishments in Brazil
20th-century Roman Catholic church buildings in Brazil